Chats (formerly sometimes known as "chat-thrushes") are a group of small Old World insectivorous birds formerly classified as members of the thrush family (Turdidae), but following genetic DNA analysis, are now considered to belong to the Old World flycatcher family (Muscicapidae).

The name is normally applied to the more robust ground-feeding flycatchers found in Europe and Asia and most northern species are strong migrants. There are many genera and these birds in particular make up most of the subfamily Saxicolinae.

Other songbirds called "chats" are:
 Australian chats, genera Ashbyia and Epthianura of the honeyeater family (Meliphagidae). They belong to a more ancient lineage than Saxicolinae.
 American chats, genus Granatellus of the cardinal family (Cardinalidae), formerly placed in the wood-warbler family. They belong to a more modern lineage than Saxicolinae.
 Yellow-breasted chat (Icteria virens), an enigmatic North American songbird tentatively placed in the wood-warbler family (Parulidae); its true relationships are unresolved.

Species in taxonomic order
 Subfamily Saxicolinae
 Genus Tarsiger - bush-robins
 Red-flanked bluetail or orange-flanked bush-robin, Tarsiger cyanurus
 Golden bush robin, Tarsiger chrysaeus
 White-browed bush robin, Tarsiger indicus
 Rufous-breasted bush robin, Tarsiger hyperythrus
 Collared bush robin, Tarsiger johnstoniae
 Genus Luscinia (4 species) 
 Genus Calliope (4 species)
 Genus Larvivora  (8 species)
 Genus Erithacus - European robin
 Genus Irania - white-throated robin
 Genus Saxicola - bushchats and stonechats (c. 15 species)
 Genus Pogonocichla
 White-starred robin, Pogonocichla stellata
 Genus Swynnertonia
 Swynnerton's robin, Swynnertonia swynnertoni
 Genus Stiphrornis - forest robins (1-5 species, depending on taxonomy)
 Genus Xenocopsychus
 Angola cave chat, Xenocopsychus ansorgei
 Genus Saxicoloides - Indian robin (formerly)
 Genus Cinclidium
 Blue-fronted robin, Cinclidium frontale
 Genus Myiomela
 White-tailed robin, Myiomela leucura
 Javan blue robin, Myiomela diana
 Sumatran blue robin, Myiomela sumatrana
 Genus Grandala
 Grandala, Grandala coelicolor
 Genus Namibornis
 Herero chat, Namibornis herero
 Genus Emarginata
 Sickle-winged chat, Emarginata sinuata
 Karoo chat, Emarginata schlegelii
 Tractrac chat, Emarginata tractrac
 Genus Oenanthe
 Familiar chat, Oenanthe familiaris
 Brown-tailed rock chat, Oenanthe scotocerca
 Brown rock chat, Oenanthe fusca
 Sombre rock chat, Oenanthe dubia
 Blackstart, Oenanthe melanura
 Moorland chat, Oenanthe sordida
 Genus Myrmecocichla
 Sooty chat (Myrmecocichla nigra)
 Anteater chat (Myrmecocichla aethiops)
 Congo moor chat (Myrmecocichla tholloni)
 Ant-eating chat (Myrmecocichla formicivora)
 Rüppell's black chat (Myrmecocichla melaena)
 Mountain chat (Myrmecocichla monticola)
 Arnot's chat (Myrmecocichla arnoti)
 Ruaha chat (Myrmecocichla collaris)
 Genus Thamnolaea - cliff chats
 Mocking cliff chat, Thamnolaea cinnamomeiventris
 White-winged cliff chat, Thamnolaea semirufa
 Genus Pinarornis
 Boulder chat Pinarornis plumosus

Saxicolinae genera not usually called "chats" are:
 Genus Sheppardia - akalats (9 species)
 Genus Cossyphicula - white-bellied robin-chat - may belong in Cossypha
 Genus Cossypha - robin-chats (15 species, excluding the white-bellied robin-chat)
 Genus Cichladusa - palm-thrushes (3 species)
 Genus Cercotrichas - scrub-robins or bush-chats (10 species)
 Genus Myophonus, whistling thrushes
 Genus Copsychus -  magpie-robins or shamas (12 species)
 Genus Phoenicurus - true redstarts (11 species)
 Genus Enicurus - forktails (7 species)
 Genus Cochoa - cochoas (4 species)
 Genus Brachypteryx -  (10 species)
 Genus Heinrichia -  great shortwing
 Genus Leonardina -  Bagobo babbler
 Genus Oenanthe - wheatears (some 20 species)

Aberrant redstarts, possibly belonging in this subfamily:
 Genus Chaimarrornis - white-capped redstart
 Genus Rhyacornis (2 species)

References